Irene Schoof (born 1963) is a Dutch former cricketer. She played fifteen Women's One Day International matches for the Netherlands women's national cricket team. She was part of the Netherlands squad for the 1988 Women's Cricket World Cup.

References

External links
 

1963 births
Living people
Dutch women cricketers
Netherlands women One Day International cricketers
Place of birth missing (living people)
20th-century Dutch women
20th-century Dutch people
21st-century Dutch women